

Explorations
 Start of Stonehenge Riverside Project (continues to 2008).
 Identification of Neolithic sources of jadeite on Monte Viso and Monte Beigua in Italy.

Excavations
 Start of Ness of Brodgar excavation in Scotland.
 Start of Dungarvan Valley Caves Project in Ireland.
 Full excavation of High Pasture Cave on Skye.

Finds
 April - First British cave art discovered at Creswell Crags.
 June - Staffordshire Moorlands Pan found in England, a Celtic vessel with inscriptions relating to Hadrian's Wall.
 July - Russian monitor Russalka (1867) located by sonar in the Gulf of Finland.
 August - Tse-whit-zen village discovered on the Washington coast during construction work.
 Autumn–December - Prittlewell royal Anglo-Saxon burial near Southend-on-Sea in England, the grave, dated to about 580 AD, of a high-status man, perhaps Saexa (brother to Sæberht of Essex), buried with objects including Christian symbols.
 Boscombe Bowmen's shared grave of around 2300 BCE discovered in southern England.
 Cirebon shipwreck (early 10th century) in the Java Sea, containing a large amount of Chinese Yue ware and important evidence of the Maritime Silk Road.
 Dutch-built fluyt Swan located in Baltic Sea.
 Roman base silver coin hoard at Chalgrove in Oxfordshire, England, including one of Domitianus, briefly ruler of the Gallic Empire.
 Iron Age gold coin hoard at Henley-on-Thames in Oxfordshire, England.

Publications
 Wayne D. Cocroft and Roger J. C. Thomas - Cold War: building for nuclear confrontation 1946-1989.
 
 Adrienne Mayor - Greek Fire, Poison Arrows and Scorpion Bombs: biological and chemical warfare in the ancient world.
 Colin Renfrew - Figuring It Out: What are we? Where do we come from? – The parallel visions of artists and archaeologists.
 Ruth M. Van Dyke and Susan E. Alcock (ed.) - Archaeologies of Memory.

Events
 July 17 - The International Committee for the Conservation of the Industrial Heritage adopts the Nizhny Tagil Charter for the Industrial Heritage.
 November 10 - Official opening of the Department of First World War Archaeology in the Institute for the Archaeological Heritage of the Flemish Community (IAP) at Ypres.
 December 26 - The 2003 Bam earthquake devastates the Arg-e Bam in Iran.
 Contemporary and Historical Archaeology in Theory group formed.
 The fake "ancient Egyptian" Amarna Princess statue, actually made by Shaun Greenhalgh, is sold to Bolton Museum in England.

Deaths
 January 22 - Mary Chubb, English archaeologist and author; worked in Egypt and the Near East (b. 1903)
 July 30 - Mendel L. Peterson, American underwater archaeologist (b. 1918)

See also
 List of years in archaeology

References

Archaeology by year
Archaeology